The Battle of Castelfidardo took place on 18 September 1860 at Castelfidardo, a small town in the Marche region of Italy. It was fought between the Sardinian army – acting as the driving force in the war for Italian unification, against the Papal States.

Prologue 
On 7 September, Cavour, Prime Minister of Piedmont, sent an ultimatum to the Pope demanding that he dismiss his foreign troops. When he failed to do this, 35,000 troops crossed the border on 11 September, with General Enrico Cialdini advancing along the Adriatic coast and General Della Rocca leading another troop across Umbria. Papal troops were caught by surprise and thrown into confusion. Some of the Papal troops surrendered the same day and some retreated to Ancona which fell on  after a short siege.

Battle 
The battle is remembered for being bloody, and for the highly disparate numbers of troops—fewer than 10,000 Papal soldiers to 39,000 Sardinians.

Papal Army 
The papal army was composed of volunteers from many European countries, amongst whom the French and Belgian nationals constituted a Franco-Belgian battalion. Among the French volunteers were a notable number of nobles from western France: after the battle, whilst consulting the list of dead and wounded members of the papal army, the Sardinian general Cialdini is reported to have said, in an example of black humor, "you would think this was a list of invites for a ball given by Louis XIV!"

The Franco-Belgian, Austrian and Irish battalions later joined the Papal Zouaves, an infantry regiment of international composition that pledged to aid Pope Pius IX in the protection of the Papacy for the remainder of the Italian unificationist Risorgimento.

Military and political results 
As a result of this battle, the Marche and Umbria entered the Kingdom of Italy and the Papal States were reduced to the area of what is today known as Lazio.

Commemoration 

References

External links 
 

1860 in Italy
Battles involving the Papal States
Conflicts in 1860
September 1860 events
Castelfidardo
Castelfidardo